Tazeh Kand (also Romanized as Tāzeh Kand) is a village in Howmeh Rural District, in the Central District of Sarab County, East Azerbaijan Province, Iran. At the 2006 census, its population was 586, with 149 families.

References 

Populated places in Sarab County